The Boxset (also referred to as Amon Tobin) is the 6-LP, 7-CD, 2-DVD compilation boxset by the Brazilian electronic musician Amon Tobin, released on 25 May 2012, on Ninja Tune. The Boxset includes Tobin's new music, along with his unreleased dubplates, earliest audio experiments, film and television scores, deleted bootlegs, remixes, cover versions and re-interpretations of Tobin's previous 2011 album ISAM, the ISAM live audio album and DVD, Tobin's remixes for other artists – as well as the recording of the November 2010 orchestrations of Tobin's music by The London Metropolitan Orchestra.

Background 
The Boxset was released as a 4000-copies limited-edition, in the form of bolt-fastened mechanical press, made of a ½-inch medium-density fibreboard, designed by the design studio Oscar & Ewan, and produced by the packaging production studio Think Tank. The release contains 6 10" vinyls, 7 CDs, 2 DVDs, and posters. 10" sleeves, CD/DVD housing, and poster all have holes in the each corner which allow them to be passed on to the bolts. 

Most of the included material has not been released earlier on a physical format. Additionally, the set contains a registration information for further downloadable material "we couldn't fit in the box": ambient tracks, all material from the vinyl EPs, the score for the 2006 comedy-drama horror film Taxidermia, as well as the collection of ISAM remixes by Frank Riggio.

Parallel to the release of the Boxset, in May 2012, Tobin performed tracks from ISAM and classic material in the audiovisual ISAM: Live show at the O2 Brixton Academy in London, and at the FutureEverything Festival in Manchester, after sold out shows at the Roundhouse and London Forum, which featured visual backdrops by V Squared Labs.

Critical reception 
Wired magazine panned the compilation "a bolt-fastened art object for Amon Tobin completists".

Track listing 
Details of the release based on credits on Tobin's official website.
Tracks 1 to 10 were released on Tobin's website monthly between 2007 and 2010.

Selected from scores written by Amon Tobin for various film and video gamesSection 1, entitled The Lost Scores, are tracks 1–16. Section 2, entitled Mike Schrieve collaboration, are tracks 17–18. Section 3, entitled Old Dub Plates, are tracks 19–21. And section 4, entitled Teenage Experiments, are tracks 22–28.

Adapted for orchestra by Ilan Eshkeri.

Previously released digitally on 11 June 2008.

References

External links 
Detailed view of the Boxset

Amon Tobin albums
Ninja Tune albums
2012 compilation albums